The Waitemata Dolphins were a New Zealand basketball team based in Auckland. The Dolphins competed in the National Basketball League (NBL) and played their home games at Auckland YMCA.

Team history
The Waitemata Dolphins were a foundation member of the National Basketball League (NBL) in 1982. They were runners-up in the league's inaugural season before finishing fourth in 1983. They subsequently withdrew from the NBL, and in 1985, they finished second in the Northern Conference of the second-tiered Conference Basketball League (CBL). After winning the CBL championship in 1987, Waitemata returned to the NBL for the 1988 season. They finished seventh in 1988 and ninth in 1989.

The team was replaced in the NBL in 1990 by the Waitakere Rangers following the creation of Waitakere City with the amalgamation of Waitemata City with a number of neighbouring boroughs.

References

External links
 

Basketball teams established in 1982
1982 establishments in New Zealand
Basketball teams in Auckland
National Basketball League (New Zealand) teams